Grubenhagen may refer to:

 The Welf Principality of Grubenhagen named after the castle
 A village in the municipality of Weitenhagen in the district of Ostvorpommern in Mecklenburg-Vorpommern, Germany
 The village of Kirch Grubenhagen in the municipality of Vollrathsruhe in Müritz district in Mecklenburg-Vorpommern, Germany